Rancho Sausal Redondo (Round Willow-grove Ranch) was a  Mexican land grant in present day Los Angeles County, California given in 1837 to Antonio Ygnacio Ávila by Juan Alvarado Governor of Alta California.   Rancho Sausal Redondo covered the area that now includes Playa Del Rey, El Segundo, Manhattan Beach, Lawndale, Hermosa Beach, Inglewood, Hawthorne, and Redondo Beach.

History
Antonio Ygnacio Ávila (1781–1858), a member of the Ávila family of California, married Rosa Maria Ruiz (1789–1866) in 1804.

In 1822, Antonio Ygnacio Ávila was granted a permit from the new Mexican government to utilize grazing land totaling approximately 25,000 acres on what was to become Rancho Sausal Redondo. Ávila received a land grant of Rancho Sausal Redondo for most of this land from Governor Juan Alverado on May 20, 1837.

With the cession of California to the United States following the Mexican–American War, the 1848 Treaty of Guadalupe Hidalgo provided that the land grants would be honored. As required by the Land Act of 1851, a claim for Rancho Sausal Redondo was filed with the Public Land Commission in 1852, and the grant was patented to Antonio Ygnacio Ávila in 1855.

Antonio Ygnacio Ávila died in 1858, and in 1868 Ávila's heirs were forced to sell the rancho to pay the probate costs. The Rancho was sold to Sir Robert Burnett (11th. Baronet, 1876–1894) who used the land for sheep and cattle raising. Having previously acquired Rancho Aguaje de la Centinela, Burnett combined the total area into the Centinela Ranch, thus reuniting the major area of the original land grant. Clear title to the land did not occur until 1873, when a U.S. District Court upheld Burnett's purchase against a suit filed by Ávila heir Tomas Avila Sanchez.

In 1873, Robert Burnett leased the land to Daniel Freeman and returned to his native Scotland. Freeman moved to the ranch with his family, increased the stock, and planted citrus trees. When the 1875 drought ruined the livestock industry, Freeman turned to dry farming. In 1885, Freeman purchased the remainder of Rancho Sausal Redondo. Daniel Freeman was the last person to own all of Rancho Sausal Redondo.

Historic sites of the Rancho
Centinela Adobe – Burnett's adobe ranch house in Inglewood.

See also
Ranchos of California
List of Ranchos of California

References

External links
  Diseño del Rancho Sausal Redondo : Calif.  fromcontent.cdlib.org California Digital Library, Contributing Institution: UC Berkeley, Bancroft Library
  Plat of the Rancho Sausal Redondo, 1868 from hdl.huntington.org, Huntington Digital Library
  Map of old Spanish and Mexican ranchos in Los Angeles County

 

Sausal Redondo
Sausal Redondo
History of Los Angeles
El Segundo, California
Hermosa Beach, California
Inglewood, California
Hawthorne, California
Lawndale, California
Manhattan Beach, California
Redondo Beach, California
South Bay, Los Angeles
19th century in Los Angeles